Dudu, real name Olegário Tolóí de Oliveira (born 7 November 1939 in Araraquara, São Paulo), is a former Brazilian football player at the position of midfielder. He played for Palmeiras from 1964 to 1976. He also was the Palmeiras head coach from 1976 to 1980.

Honours
Player
Brazilian Série A: 1967, 1967, 1969, 1972, 1973
Rio-São Paulo Tournament: 1965
São Paulo State Championship: 1966, 1972, 1974

Coach
São Paulo State Championship: 1976

References

1939 births
Living people
People from Araraquara
Brazilian footballers
Brazilian football managers
Sociedade Esportiva Palmeiras players
Sevilla FC players
Associação Desportiva Confiança players
Sociedade Esportiva Palmeiras managers
Desportiva Ferroviária managers
Association football midfielders
Footballers from São Paulo (state)
Paulista Futebol Clube managers